The history of Northern Nigeria covers the history of the region form pre-historic times to the modern period of Northern Nigerian state.

Pre-History

The Nok culture, an ancient culture dominated most of what is now Northern Nigeria in pre historic times, its legacy in the form of terracotta statues and megaliths have been discovered in Sokoto, Kano, Birinin Kudu, Nok and Zaria. The Kwatarkwashi culture, a variant of the Nok culture centred mostly around Zamfara in Sokoto Province is thought by some to be the same or an offshoot of the Nok.

The Fourteen Kingdoms

In the 9th century a set kingdoms emerged in Northern Nigeria to replace the Kabara Nation, these Kingdoms share a similar ethno-historical dynamic cemented in their belief in a common origin. The lore of the Fourteen Kingdoms unify the diverse heritage of Northern Nigeria into a cohesive system. Seven of these Kingdoms developed from the Kabara legacy of the Hausa people. As vibrant trading centers competing with Kanem–Bornu and Mali slowly developed in the Central Sudan, a set Kingdoms merged dominating the great savannah plains of Hausaland, their primary exports were leather, gold, cloth, salt, kola nuts, animal hides, and henna. The Seven Hausa states included:

 Daura
 Kano 998–1807
 Katsina  1400–1805
 Zazzau (Zaria)  1200–1808
 Gobir ?–1808
 Rano
 Biram  1100–1805

The growth and conquest of the Hausa Bakwai resulted in the founding of additional states with rulers tracing their lineage to a concubine of the Hausa founding father, Bayajidda. Thus they are called the 'Banza Bakwai meaning Bastard Seven. The Banza Bakwai adopted many of the customs and institutions of the Hausa Bakwai but were considered unsanctioned or copy-cat kingdoms by non-Hausa people. These states include:

Zamfara
Kebbi
Yauri (also called Yawuri)
Gwari (also called Gwariland)
Kwararafa (a Jukun state)
Nupe (of the Nupe people)
Ilorin (A yoruba State also known as Kwara)

Hausa States

Between 500 CE and 700 CE Hausa people, who are thought to have slowly moved from Nubia and mixing in with the local Northern and Middle Belt population, established a number of strong states in what is now Northern Nigeria and Eastern Niger. With the decline of the Nok and Sokoto, who had previously controlled Central and Northern Nigeria between 800 BCE and 200 CE, the Hausa were able to emerge as the new power in the region. They are closely linked with the Kanuri people of Kanem–Bornu (Lake Chad), the Birom, Gwari, Nupe and Jukun. The Hausa aristocracy, under influence from the Mali Empire adopted Islam in the 11th century CE. By the 12th century CE, the Hausa were becoming one of Africa's major powers. The architecture of the Hausa is perhaps one of the least known but most beautiful of the medieval age. Many of their early mosques and palaces are bright and colourful and often include intricate engraving or elaborate symbols designed into the facade. By 1500 CE, the Hausa utilized a modified Arabic script known as Ajami to record their own language; the Hausa compiled several written histories, the most popular being the Kano Chronicle.

Sokoto Period

In the 19th Century, the Fula people led a series of jihads across sudanic Africa. In Northern Nigeria and the central Sudan, Usman dan Fodio led the Fula in a bid to overthrow the Hausa Sultanates. By 1803, a new state known as the Sokoto Caliphate had replaced most of the former sultanates that had held sway over the region. The Sokoto Caliphate was under the overall authority of the Commander of the Faithful. Under Dan Fodio, the Empire was bicephalous and divided into two territories each controlled by an appointed vizier. Each of the territories was further divided into autonomous Emirates under mainly hereditary local Emirs. The Bornu Empire was initially absorbed into the Sokoto Caliphate of Usman dan Fodio, but broke away after a few years later.

Colonial Period

The Initial contact of Northern Nigeria with the British was predominantly trade-related, and revolved around the expansion of the Royal Niger Company, whose interior territories spread north from about where the Niger River and Benue River joined at Lokoja, a place called (Mount Patti Hill).  The Royal Niger Company's territory did not represent a direct threat to much the Sokoto Caliphate or the numerous states of Northern Nigeria. This changed, when Fredrick Lugard and Taubman Goldie laid down an ambitious plan to pacify the Niger interior and unite it with the rest of the British Empire in 1897 Lugard proclaimed a protectorate over Northern Nigeria and hostilities though sporadic soon followed; the Calipharte itself never responded to Lugards onslaught, this allowed him pacify the Emirates one by one. In February 1903, the fort of Kano fell and its slave market closed, sokoto and other regions soon followed. By the early 1920s the last pockets of resistance located in the Kanem had been pacified.

Protectorate Period

The protectorate of Northern Nigeria was proclaimed at Ida by Fredrick Lugard on January 1, 1897. The basis of the colony was the 1885 Treaty of Berlin which broadly granted Northern Nigeria to Britain, on the basis of their protectorates in Southern Nigeria. Hostilities with the powerful Sokoto Caliphate soon followed. The Emirates of Kabba, Kotogora and Ilorin were the first to be conquered by the British. In February 1903, the great fort of Kano, seat of the Kano Emirate was captured, Sokoto and much of the rest of its Caliphate soon capitulated. On March 13, 1903, the Grand Shura of Caliphate finally conceded to Lugard's demands and proclaimed Queen Victoria, Queen and sovereign of the Caliphate and all its lands.

The Governor, Frederick Lugard, with limited resources, ruled with the consent of local rulers through a policy of indirect rule which he developed into a sophisticated political theory. Lugard left the protectorate after some years, serving in Hong Kong, but was eventually returned to work in Nigeria where he decided on the merger of the Northern Nigeria Protectorate with Southern Nigeria in 1914. Agitation for independence from the radically different Southern Protectorate however led to a formidable split in the 1940s. The Richards constitution, proclaimed in 1945 gave overwhelming autonomy to the North, including eventually in the areas of foreign relations and customs policy.

40-year interregnum
From 1914 to 1953, the much larger Northern Nigeria was amalgamated with the Nigerian South in the Colony and Protectorate of Nigeria, and its administration was virtually controlled from the South. During this period, local government was administered by a string of Lieutenant Governors and Chief Commissioners. In the 1940s agitation for Northernisation led to the Richards and eventually to the Macpherson constitution of 1953, which granted exceptional self-governing powers (including in the areas of foreign policy, customs and border control) to the North.

Independence
Northern Nigeria was granted independence on March 15, 1953, with Sir Ahmadu Bello as its first premier. the Northern Peoples Congress under Sir Ahmadu Bello dominated parliament while the Northern Elements Progressive Union became the main opposition party.

References

 
History of Nigeria